The Moffat Tunnel is a railroad and water tunnel that cuts through the Continental Divide in north-central Colorado. Named after Colorado railroad pioneer David Moffat, the tunnel's first official railroad traffic passed through in February 1928.

The Moffat Tunnel finally provided Denver with a western link through the Continental Divide, as both Cheyenne, Wyoming, to the north and Pueblo to the south already enjoyed rail access to the West Coast. It follows the right-of-way laid out by Moffat in 1902 while he was seeking a better and shorter route from Denver to Salt Lake City. The Moffat Tunnel averages 15 trains per day. The railroad and water tunnels parallel one another; the water tunnel delivers a portion of Denver's water supply. In 1979, the tunnel was designated as a National Historic Civil Engineering Landmark by the American Society of Civil Engineers.

Overview
The tunnel has a gradient of 1 in 125 (0.8%).

, the Moffat was the fourth longest railroad tunnel in North America. It was the longest non-electrified tunnel until 1956, when electrification was removed from the Cascade Tunnel.

The tunnel is single-tracked, so only one train is run through at a time, usually with eastbound and westbound trains alternating. For safety reasons, passengers are asked not to move from one car to another while the train is in the tunnel.

Ventilation system
The tunnel is ventilated by massive fans operating after a train has exited the tunnel.  The portals have doors which are shut before the fans are activated.  Originally, trains would have to wait some 20–30 minutes before proceeding into the tunnel after the doors were re-opened.  Today, a sensor system is employed to evaluate the clearance of diesel exhaust, which today can be less than 20 minutes for lighter trains.

History

The tunnel was conceived by David Moffat of the Denver, Northwestern and Pacific (DNW&P) railroad as early as 1902. The original DNW&P tracks climbed Rollins Pass with a series of switch back loops with a steep 4% grade and severe snow conditions. Snow removal on the original line made it unprofitable to operate.

Moffat was unable to raise sufficient funds to build the tunnel before he died in 1911, but the forces behind the tunnel continued, and in 1914 a Denver bond issue was approved financing two thirds of the construction cost of the tunnel. The issue was defeated in a court decision which ruled that Denver did not have the constitutional right to enter into a joint venture to construct the tunnel with a private corporation.

In 1920 a bill was introduced in the state legislature to build three tunnels under Monarch Pass, Cumbres Pass, and Rollins Pass (the Moffat Route). The various regions of the state could not come to agreement, partly because southern and southwestern regions feared that Denver would gain a new advantage in commerce from the Moffat Route. Blocking this legislation would ultimately backfire when Denver was finally able to secure financing for its tunnel.

In early 1922 Denver's lawmakers in the state legislature found an opening. Pueblo had been devastated by a flood, and Gov. Oliver Henry Shoup called an emergency session of the legislature. Denver lawmakers now had power over Pueblo. They would vote for emergency funding for the beleaguered town (an economic rival to Denver) in return for legislation authorizing the issuance of bonds for Denver's tunnel. A deal was struck, and on April 29, the Moffat Tunnel Improvement District was created.

The district boundaries included the City and County of Denver, and all or portions of the counties traversed by the Denver and Salt Lake Railway. The district had the authority to levy taxes and issue bonds backed by real estate within the district. The following summer, bonds were sold and construction began.

The bonds were fully paid off in December 1983, but the commission continued to exist until 1998. It was finally disbanded after a series of political intrigues related to Winter Park Resort, which was built partly on land owned by the commission (known as the Evans Tract).

In 1988, Rio Grande Industries, the company that controlled the Denver and Rio Grande Western Railroad, purchased the Southern Pacific Railroad. The combined company took the Southern Pacific name because of its name recognition among shippers. On September 11, 1996, owner Philip Anschutz sold the combined company to the Union Pacific Railroad in response to the earlier merger of the Burlington Northern and the Santa Fe which formed the Burlington Northern and Santa Fe Railway.

Construction

The Moffat Tunnel was cut under a shoulder of James Peak. In 1925 bad rock at the west end of the tunnel delayed construction and costs soared. The pilot tunnel was officially "holed through" on February 18, 1927, the blast of dynamite set off by President Calvin Coolidge pressing a key in Washington, D.C., and the program was broadcast by radio from the heart of the mountain. Three more bond issues were sold before the tunnel was completed.

The railroad tunnel was holed through on July 7, 1927, and formally turned over to the lessee on February 26, 1928. The first train passed through the tunnel in February 1928.

Although the original cost of the tunnel was pegged at $6.62 million, final assessments collected by the Moffat Tunnel district, including interest, were $23,972,843. The cost of the two tunnels was $15.6 million ($ adjusted for inflation), which is $475 per linear foot ($1,558 per linear meter). Each of the ornamental bronze characters on the east and west portals (entrances) of the tunnel cost $40 and a separate cast had to be made for each character. Further, on each portal are the dates: 1923 (when construction began) and 1927 (the year the tunnel was scheduled to be completed). By not changing 1927 to 1928 (the year the tunnel was actually finished and opened), this saved the commission $80 ($40 each portal) at the time ($ for both adjusted for inflation). During the five-year project, 28 people died, six in a single cave-in on July 30, 1926.

Track rails in the tunnel, originally jointed, were replaced in the 1930s with continuous welded rail, one of the earliest such installations in North America. This decision was prompted by the corrosive effect of coal smoke and steam condensate, captive within the tunnel, on the joints.

Water tunnel
The pilot bore was leased to the City of Denver for use as a water tunnel to divert water east from the Colorado River Basin under the Continental Divide to the urban areas of the eastern slope. In 1979 the water tunnel was sold by the Moffat Tunnel Improvement District to the city. Since the 1940s, the tunnel has also conveyed water for the city of Englewood.

Some of the water flowing through the Moffat Tunnel to Denver actually crosses the Continental Divide three times. This water originates in the city's Williams Fork collection system, from which it passes east across the continental divide through the Gumlick Tunnel under Jones Pass, into the basin of Clear Creek. This water then flows north across the continental divide through the Vasquez Tunnel into the valley of the Fraser River before reaching the Moffat Tunnel.

East Portal Camp Cabins
On Thursday, January 30, 2020, the five remaining East Portal Camp Cabins (located at the East Portal of the Moffat Tunnel adjacent to Rollins Pass) were classified by Colorado Preservation, Inc. as one of Colorado's Most Endangered Places.

See also 
 Alva B. Adams Tunnel, another tunnel that carries water over the Continental Divide in Colorado
Cascade Tunnel, a similar and longer railroad tunnel in Washington (state)
 Connaught Tunnel, Mount Macdonald Tunnel, Big Hill Spiral Tunnels and Mount Shaughnessy Tunnel, in Canada traversing the Canadian Rockies
 Eisenhower Tunnel, equivalent tunnel for road traffic, built 50 years later.
 Lists of tunnels
 The White Desert (1925)

References

Bibliography

Further reading

 
 

Buildings and structures in Gilpin County, Colorado
Denver and Rio Grande Western Railroad
Historic Civil Engineering Landmarks
Mountain passes of Colorado
Rail mountain passes of the United States
Railroad tunnels in Colorado
Transportation buildings and structures in Grand County, Colorado
Transportation in Gilpin County, Colorado
Tunnels completed in 1927
Union Pacific Railroad tunnels
Water tunnels in the United States